Crumbling may refer to:
 Crumbling (album), 2018 album by Mid-Air Thief
 "Crumbling Land", song by Pink Floyd
 Crumbling the Antiseptic Beauty, an album by Felt
 Up and Crumbling, an EP by the Gin Blossoms

See also
 
 
 Crumb (disambiguation)
 Crumble (disambiguation)